Ulhasnagar Assembly constituency is one of the 288 Vidhan Sabha (Legislative Assembly) constituencies of Maharashtra state in western India. The constituency is dominated by Sindhi community.

Overview
Ulhasnagar constituency is one of the 18 Vidhan Sabha constituencies located in Thane district. It comprises part of the Ulhasnagar Municipal Corporation and parts of Ulhasnagar and Kalyan tehsils of the district.

Ulhasnagar is part of the Kalyan Lok Sabha constituency along with five other Vidhan Sabha segments, namely, Mumbra-Kalwa, Ambernath, Kalyan East, Kalyan Rural and Dombivali in Thane district.

Members of Legislative Assembly

Election results

Assembly Elections 1962

Assembly Elections 1967

Assembly Elections 1972

Assembly Elections 1978

Assembly Elections 1980

Assembly Elections 1985

Assembly Elections 1990

Assembly Elections 1995

Assembly Elections 1999

Assembly Elections 2004

Assembly Elections 2009

Assembly Elections 2014

Assembly Elections 2019

See also
 Ulhasnagar 
 List of constituencies of Maharashtra Vidhan Sabha

References

Assembly constituencies of Thane district
Ulhasnagar
Assembly constituencies of Maharashtra